Abbas Fallahi Babajan (born 1966) is an Iranian politician.

Fallahi was born in Ahar, East Azerbaijan. He was a member of the 9th Islamic Consultative Assembly from the electorate of Ahar and Heris. Fallahi won with 40,848 (37.10%) votes.

References

People from Ahar
Deputies of Ahar and Heris
Living people
1966 births
Members of the 9th Islamic Consultative Assembly